Eriksson is a common Swedish patronymic surname meaning "son of Erik", itself an Old Norse given name. There are other spelling variations of this surname (123 228 people in Sweden) such as Erikson (419), Ericson (3 442), Ericsson (5 730) and Erixon (55). Erikson is uncommon as a given name. Notable people with the surname include:

 Amalia Eriksson (1824–1923), Swedish businesswoman
 Anders Eriksson, born 1975, Swedish ice hockey player
 Anders Eriksson, born 1985, Swedish ice hockey player
 Åsa Eriksson (born 1972), Swedish politician
 Charlotta Eriksson (1794–1862), Swedish actress
 Clas Eriksson, Swedish ice hockey player
 Dan-Ola Eriksson (born 1963), Swedish curler
 Erik Homburger Erikson (born 1902), developmental psychologist and psychoanalyst
 Felix Eriksson (ice hockey) (born 1992), Swedish professional ice hockey player
 Fredrik Eriksson, Swedish ice hockey player
 Håkan Eriksson, Swedish ice hockey player
 Hans-Erik Eriksson (born 1961), Swedish computer scientist
 Helena Eriksson (born 1962), Swedish poet
 Henrik Eriksson, Swedish ice hockey player
 Jan Eriksson, Swedish ice hockey player
 Jonas Eriksson, several people
 Joacim Eriksson, Swedish ice hockey player
 Kenneth Eriksson (born 1956), Swedish rally driver
 Lars Eriksson, several people
 Leif Eriksson (Leifr Eiríksson) (c. 970 – c. 1020), Icelandic-born Norse explorer, son of Erik the Red
 Lena Eriksson (born 1972), Swedish breaststroke swimmer 
 Lennart Eriksson (born 1956), Swedish musician (Ebba Grön).
 Loui Eriksson, Swedish ice hockey player
 Magdalena Eriksson, Swedish footballer
 Magnus Eriksson, Swedish ice hockey player
 Marcus Eriksson, Swedish ice hockey player
 Matz Robert Eriksson (born 1972), Swedish drummer
 Peter Eriksson, Swedish ice hockey player
 Sanne Lennström (née Eriksson) (born 1988), Swedish politician
 Sebastian Eriksson (born 1989), Swedish footballer
 Sven-Göran Eriksson (born 1948), Swedish football manager
 Sven-Olov Eriksson (1929–1999), Swedish runner
 Thomas Eriksson, Swedish ice hockey player
 Tim Eriksson, Swedish ice hockey player
 Ursula and Sabina Eriksson, born in Sunne, Sweden, are Swedish identical twins, who survived suicide attempts by being run over by motorway traffic in front of the Police and Highway authorities, with Sabina committing manslaughter the following day, in the UK in 2008

See also
Ericsson (surname)
Erikson
Erickson (surname)
Derrickson

References

Swedish-language surnames
Patronymic surnames
Surnames from given names